Quchayuq (Quechua qucha lake, -yuq a suffix, "the one with a lake (or lakes)", also spelled Jochajoi) is a mountain in Peru which reaches a height of approximately  . It is located in the Apurímac Region, Andahuaylas Province, Cachi District.

References

Mountains of Peru
Mountains of Apurímac Region